Pacaembu is a municipality in the state of São Paulo in Brazil. The population is 14,263 (2020 est.) in an area of 339 km². The elevation is 415 m.

References

Municipalities in São Paulo (state)